Vasily Shibanov is a poem by Aleksey Konstantinovich Tolstoy, written in the late 1840s and first published in the September 1858 issue of The Russian Messenger magazine. The poem, a folk ballad in both structure and tone, deals with a real episode in the history of the 16th century Russian Empire, namely the deflection of Prince Kurbsky to the Grand Duchy of Lithuania and the way he sent the damning letter to Ivan the Terrible with his servant Shibanov, which meant imminent death for the latter.

Background
For a source Tolstoy used the fragment of Nikolay Karamzin's History of the Russian State relating how "…Kurbsky by night clandestinely left his home, climbed over the city wall, found two of the horses his loyal servant prepared for him and safely reached Volmar, then under the Lithuanians." Received warmly by Sigismund II Augustus's men, Kurbsky sat down to write a letter (first of the three) to the Russian Tsar and then sent it with his stremyanny (the senior cavalry servant), who earlier helped him to escape from Moscow. 

According to the History, what Ivan the Terrible did first was hit and pierce the messenger's foot with his sharp baton, so as to nail him down to the floor, then asked one of his men to read the letter, Shibanov all the while standing nearby, profusely bleeding. The reading finished, Ivan, keen on learning everything about the fugitive's allies in Moscow, ordered the messenger to be taken to the torture chamber. According to Karamzin, "...the virtuous servant, named Vasily Shibanov, betrayed nobody. Suffering greatly, he praised his master, saying how happy he was to die for him."

The Letter
The source of the verses 11 and 12 was the text of Kurbsky's letter, published in Prince Kurbsky's Tales (1833). In Tolstoy's rendition the fragment of the letter goes as follows:

Vasily Shibanov's death
In the poem, once the reading is over, the Tsar's look becomes enigmatic and dark, tinged with something that looks like sorrow. Totally in control, he makes a dramatic confession.  His mood changes, but the last words Vasily Shibanov hears from him sound calm, rational and tinged with a mix of respect, sympathy and morbid irony. Ivan the Terrible says:  
In his last moment Shibanov, implores God to forgive both his master's treason (only mentioning personal betrayal) and his own sins, then prays for his Tsar and his country:

References 

1858 poems
Poetry by Aleksey Konstantinovich Tolstoy
Works originally published in The Russian Messenger